Noffkarkys ("net of Noffke") is a genus of problematic fossil from the Ediacaran (550 million years old) Grant Bluff Formation of Central Mount Stuart, Northern Territory, Australia, and another protrates frond like fossil. The genus was named in honor of Nora Noffke.

Description
Noffkarkys is an Ediacaran fossil frond with a fine pattern of rhombic quilts radiating from the base which does not include a rounded holdfast. Like other Ediacaran frond such as Trepassia which also lacks a holdfast, Noffkarkys may have lived prone on the substrate. The fine quilting extends deep into the matrix from the upper side as seen in petrographic thin section.

Biological affinities

Noffkarkys is a problematic fossil like many Ediacaran genera. Affinities may be with sea pens or lichens.

References

Ediacaran life
Fossil taxa described in 2020
Controversial taxa